Hayden Godfrey (born 15 December 1978 in Hokitika, New Zealand) is a cycling competitor for New Zealand. He competed at the 2006 Commonwealth Games in Melbourne where along with Tim Gudsell, Peter Latham and Marc Ryan he won a bronze medal in the Team pursuit.

Major results
2001
 UCI World Cup Classics, Cali
 1st Team pursuit
 2nd Individual pursuit
 1st Stage 1 Brandenburg Rundfahrt
2002
 1st  Points classification Tour of Southland
2003
 UCI World Cup Classics, Aguascalientes
 2nd Individual pursuit
 UCI World Cup Classics, Sydney
 1st Team pursuit
 2nd Individual pursuit
2004
 UCI World Cup Classics, Aguascalientes
 2nd Team pursuit
 1st Prologue Sea Otter Classic
2005
 UCI World Cup Classics, Manchester
 1st Team pursuit
 UCI World Cup Classics, Sydney
 1st Team pursuit
 New Zealand Cycle Classic
 1st  Points classification
 1st Stages 1 & 7
 1st  Points classification Tour of Southland
 National Road Championships
3rd Road race
5th Time trial
2006
 National Road Championships
2nd Road race
3rd Time trial
 3rd  Team pursuit, Commonwealth games
2007
 National Road Championships
6th Time trial
2008
 1st  Omnium, UCI Track World Championships
2009
 UCI World Cup Classics, Beijing
1st Scratch race
2010
 UCI World Cup Classics, Beijing
2nd Scratch race

References

Living people
1978 births
New Zealand male cyclists
Commonwealth Games bronze medallists for New Zealand
Cyclists at the 1998 Commonwealth Games
Cyclists at the 2002 Commonwealth Games
Cyclists at the 2006 Commonwealth Games
Olympic cyclists of New Zealand
Cyclists at the 2004 Summer Olympics
People from Hokitika
UCI Track Cycling World Champions (men)
Commonwealth Games medallists in cycling
New Zealand track cyclists
Medallists at the 2006 Commonwealth Games